Abul Kalam is the name of:

Abul Kalam Azad (1888–1958), an Indian scholar and the senior Muslim leader of the Indian National Congress
Abul Kalam Azad (photographer) (born 1964), a contemporary Indian photographer
Abul Kalam Azad (politician) (born 1947), a former Bangladeshi politician of the Jamaat-e-Islami
Abul Kalam Azad (officer) (1971–2017), a lieutenant colonel of Bangladesh Army
A. P. J. Abdul Kalam (1931-2015), a scientist and former President of India
Abul Kalam Azad (Jamalpur politician), a member of parliament of the Jatiya Sangsad and former information minister of Bangladesh
Abul Kalam (kabaddi) (born 1978), a Bangladeshi kabaddi player 
Abul Kalam (vice-chancellor) (1923–2013), a Pakistani educator and engineer